The Steve Camp Collection is the fifth and final compilation album for Steve Camp, and his first truly exhaustive "best-of" album containing 32 songs on two cassettes or compact discs. This would also be Camp's final major-label release, as his final two releases; 1999's "Abandoned to God" and 2002's "Desiring God" would be released on the small Ministry Music label and self-released respectively.

Track listing 
Disc one
Farther and Higher
Light Your Candle
It's a Dying World
Fire and Ice
Living in Laodicea
Love's Not a Feeling
Upon This Rock
Shake Me to Wake Me
Lazy Jane
Stranger to Holiness
Surrender Your Heart
He Covers Me
Threshing Floor
Foolish Things
One on One
Cheap Grace
He's All You Need

Disc two
Do Something Now (with CAUSE; this was from a 1984 charity collaboration)
Whatever You Ask
Come to the Lord
After God's Own Heart
Do You Feel Their Pain
Living Dangerously in the Hands of God
Don't Tell Them Jesus Loves Them
Great American Novel (originally recorded by Larry Norman)
Run to the Battle
For Every Time
Consider the Cost
Follow Me
Guard the Trust
Shade for the Children
Carry Me

References 

Steve Camp compilation albums
1995 compilation albums
Sparrow Records compilation albums